The trial of William Laud, archbishop of Canterbury, took place in stages in the first half of the 1640s, and resulted in his execution on treason charges. At first an impeachment, the parliamentary legal proceedings became an act of attainder.

Arrested in late 1640, Laud was held initially for tactical reasons in the struggle between Charles I of England and the English parliament. When charges were actually brought, their main thrust was that Laud had run an ecclesiastical state within a state. This was supposed to have happened under the cover of the personal rule of the king. The prosecution case was argued from the standpoint of Erastianism.

The trial has been called a "travesty of justice", in that Laud was clearly innocent of the major charges, which were not seriously documented even given the run of his private papers. Testimony against him was subject to tampering. On the other hand, Laud's defence of his own actions was not conducted with full candour; and lesser charges sometimes stuck, despite his astute use of denial of personal responsibility.

Laud in custody
William Laud was arrested at the same time as Thomas Wentworth, 1st Earl of Strafford, whose fate he would eventually share. While the impeachment of Strafford proceeded shortly, Laud's case was neglected until a point in 1643.

Laud was first placed in the custody of Black Rod, on the day (18 December 1640) when Denzil Holles moved his impeachment in the Lords. This was not a close confinement, and he was allowed a visit to Lambeth Palace and his papers. He was later confined to the Tower of London.

Laud was eventually executed in 1645.

Political situation in the English Parliament in 1641
The indictment of Laud arose from the Long Parliament, in particular from committee work around Sir John Glynne. In mid-1641 the judicial effort against King Charles's "evil consellors" was bogged down: on 12 July an effort was made to expedite the trials of Laud and George Ratcliffe, Strafford's supporter, but it failed. Thirteen bishops had been made subject to impeachment proceedings in 1640, in connection with the Laudian canons. In October 1641 Denzil Holles requested that the House of Lords should move forward with this impeachment.

Articles against Laud
The articles against Laud were brought to the House of Lords; initially they were in vague and general terms. While they are often said to be 14 definite points, the sources differ. The second set of articles from over two years later raise more specific charges. It is unclear whether the original verbal charges can be recovered accurately from the published versions, some of which can be considered pamphleteering or subject to editorial additions. Besides the English parliamentary situation, pressure from Scottish presbyterians played a part in the outcome: their views were in The Charge of the Scottish Commissioners against Canterburie and the Lieutenant of Ireland (1641).

First charges

The first set of charges was from early 1641 (N.S.). Laud was sent to the Tower in late February or March 1641, supposedly on 14 charges. These are variously recorded and documented, in versions that are ample but inconsistent.

One version is in the 18th-century State Trials of Francis Hargrave. A version of John Pym's speech to the Lords was published. A version of a pamphlet Accusation and Impeachment (1641) was later published in the Harleian Collection. The points in this version, abbreviated, are:

That he hath endeavoured to subvert the fundamental laws of this kingdom [...].
His countenancing of books for the maintenance of his unlimited power [...]
That he  went about to interrupt the judges, by his threatenings, and other means, to constrain them to give false judgment in the case of ship-money [...].
That he hath taken bribes, and sold justice in the high commission court [...].
That he hath  endeavoured the incroachment of jurisdiction, institution of canons, and they are not only against law, but prejudicial, and against the liberties of the subjects [...].
That he hath traitorously assumed to himself a capital power over his Majesty's subjects, denying his power of prelacy from the King.
That, by false erroneous doctrines, and other sinister ways and means, he went about to subvert religion, established in this kingdom, and to set up popery and superstition in the church [...].
That, by divers undue means and practices, he hath gotten into his hands the power and nominating of ministers to spiritual promotions, and hath presented none but slanderous men thereunto; and that he hath presented corrupt chaplains to his Majesty.
That his own ministers, as Heywood, Layfield, and others, are notoriously disaffected to religion; and he hath given power of licensing of books to them.
That he hath y endeavoured to reconcile us to the church of Rome; and to that end hath employed a Jesuit, a papist, and hath wrought with the pope's agents in several points.
That to suppress preaching, he hath suspended divers good and honest ministers, and hath used unlawful means, by letters, and otherwise, to set all bishops to suppress them.
That, he hath  endeavoured to suppress the French religion here with us, being the same religion we are of, and also the Dutch church, and to set division between them and us.
That he hath  endeavoured to set a division between the King and his subjects, and hath gone about to bring in innovations into the church, as by the remonstrances may appear, and hath induced the king to this war with the Scots [...].
That, to save and preserve himself from being questioned and sentenced from these and other his  designs, from the first year of his now Majesty's reign, until now, he hath laboured to subvert the rights of parliamentary proceedings, and to incense his Majesty against parliaments [...].

There is a different version attributed to Pym in William Prynne, Antipathie of the Lordly Prelacie (1641), for the date 26 February 1640 (O.S.) The version in John Rushworth's collections is not apparently as complete; or Prynne's version may contain interpolations. A summary of the whole case out of other volumes of state trials (edited by Thomas Salmon, Sollom Emlyn and Thomas Bayly Howell) was made by Alexander Simpson.

Additional charges
The second set of impeachment articles was voted by the Commons on 23 October 1643 and sent to the Lords. It was a more serious attempt to set out a legal case that could be brought to trial. These articles were given in extended form in the collections of Rushworth. Summaries were made by Daniel Neal in his History of the Puritans.

The trial begins
The trial was precipitated by Laud's refusal to present Edward Corbet to a living. Oliver St John had a hand in reviving the stalled prosecution, in 1643, having regard to the views of the Scots and his own position. Legal proceedings were started in November 1643, but initial delays occupied some months. On 28 December, as Laud recorded, Isaac Penington whose father was Lieutenant of the Tower brought Thomas Weld to confront Laud in his room, asking "in a boisterous manner" whether Laud repented.

The trial proper began on 12 March 1644. The impeachment trial ran on to 29 July. It was in front of the House of Lords, which at this stage of the First English Civil War consisted of about a dozen peers.

The prosecution team consisted of Samuel Browne, John Maynard, Robert Nicholas, and John Wylde, with William Prynne acting as solicitor. Laud's legal team was made up of Chaloner Chute, Richard Gerrard, Matthew Hale, and John Herne. The first 20 days of the trial fell into a pattern of the prosecution presenting their case in the morning, a two-hour break, and Laud answering in the afternoon.

Witnesses against Laud
John Ashe.
Edward Corbet testified to ritual innovations imposed at Merton College, Oxford.
Daniel Featley testified to William Bray's censorship of his sermons.
Thomas Foxley, imprisoned.
Joshua Hoyle testified to religious changes at Trinity College Dublin.
Thomas Hoyle
George Huntley of Kent, clergyman imprisoned for nonconformity.
Thomas Jackson, testified that Laud had tried to enforce bowing towards the altar.
John Langley. He testified to changes Laud had made to ritual as Dean of Gloucester, and prejudice to the lecturer John Workman.
Humphrey Mackworth.
Anthony and Henry Mildmay testified that Laud had factional Catholic support in Rome and had eased the Church of England's relations with the Roman Catholic Church.
Mary Oakes on behalf of her late husband John Oakes, a printer.
Michael Oldisworth. He testified that the Earl of Pembroke as lord chamberlain had been obstructed by Laud in his right to appoint royal chaplains.
Peter Smart testified to a comment of Augustine Lindsell, claiming ignorance on the part of Calvinist clergy who objected to Laudian innovations on altars.
Michael Sparke.
Samuel Vassall.
Georg Rudolph Weckherlin.
John White. He testified on the legal proceedings against the feoffees for impropriations, and actions taken against Edward Bagshaw. According to Prynne's account, he also mentioned changes made to the text of Richard Clerke's works by Laudians before their publication.
Thomas Wilson.

The case of Richard Culmer was also placed in evidence. An example brought up relating to lay property rights was the abbacy of Arbroath.

Attainder
In the end the impeachment proceedings were halted. On 30 October 1644 Parliament heard a sermon from Edmund Staunton, and the following day moved to the process of attainder. Prominent among the advocates of attainder was Sir Samuel Browne.

Laud was beheaded on Tower Hill on 10 January 1645.

Notes

History of the Church of England
Puritanism in England
Trials in London
1640s in England
1644 in law
Impeachment in the United Kingdom